Ukraine competed at the 1998 Winter Olympics in Nagano, Japan.

Medalists

Sports/disciplines and athletes
Ukraine was represented in 10 out of 14 disciplines. Despite the increase in number of disciplines, Ukraine stayed with those that it competed previously and increased number of its athletes.
 Alpine skiing (2; 1 male, 1 female)
 Biathlon (10; 4 males, 6 females)
 Bobsleigh (2; 2 males, 0 females)
 Cross-country skiing (10; 5 males, 5 females)
 Figure skating (10; 5 males, 5 females)
 Freestyle skiing (7; 3 males, 4 females)
 Luge (6; 4 males, 2 females)
 Ski jumping (3; 3 males, 0 females)
 Speed skating (4; 2 males, 2 females)
 Speed skating, short track (2; 1 male, 1 female)

Alpine skiing

Men's combined

Women

Women's combined

Biathlon

Men

Men's 4 × 7.5 km relay

Women

Women's 4 × 7.5 km relay

 1 A penalty loop of 150 metres had to be skied per missed target.
 2 One minute added per missed target.

Bobsleigh

Cross-country skiing

Men

 1 Starting delay based on 10 km results. 
 C = Classical style, F = Freestyle

Men's 4 × 10 km relay

Women

 2 Starting delay based on 5 km results. 
 C = Classical style, F = Freestyle

Women's 4 × 5 km relay

Figure skating

Men

Women

Pairs

Ice Dancing

Freestyle skiing

Men

Women

Luge

(Men's) Doubles

Women

Short track speed skating

Men

Women

Ski jumping

Speed skating

Men

Women

References
Official Olympic Reports
International Olympic Committee results database
 Olympic Winter Games 1998, full results by sports-reference.com

Nations at the 1998 Winter Olympics
1998
Winter Olympics